was a town located in Ōchi District, Shimane Prefecture, Japan.

As of 2003, the town had an estimated population of 3,437 and a density of 31.22 persons per km2. The total area was 110.10 km2.

On October 1, 2004, Sakurae was merged into the expanded city of Gōtsu.

Dissolved municipalities of Shimane Prefecture